Play Yard Blues is a solo album by John Norum-- best known as the guitarist for the Swedish hard rock band Europe. It was released on 17 May 2010.

The album includes cover versions of: the Thin Lizzy song It's Only Money, the Frank Marino & Mahogany Rush song Ditch Queen, and the Mountain song Travellin' in the Dark.

Track listing
"Let it Shine" (Norum, Torberg) – 4:55
"Red Light Green High" (Norum, Torberg) – 4:12
"It's Only Money" (Lynott) – 2:54
"Got My Eyes on You" (Norum, Sundin) – 3:14
"When Darkness Falls" (Norum, Torberg, Stappe) – 4:01
"Over and Done" (Norum, Stappe) – 3:51
"Ditch Queen" (Marino) – 5:41
"Travellin' in the Dark" (Pappalardi, Collins) – 4:11
"Born Again" (Norum, Sundin) – 4:13
"Play Yard Blues" (Norum) – 4:08

Personnel
Band
John Norum - guitars, vocals
Tomas Torberg - bass
Thomas Broman - drums
Peer Stappe - percussion

Additional personnel
Leif Sundin - vocals on "Got My Eyes on You" and "Born Again"
Mic Michaeli - keyboards

Production
Recorded at Playyard Studios, Sweden
Engineered by Peer Stappe
Produced by John Norum
Mixed at Polar Studios in Stockholm by Peer Stappe and John Norum
Mastered by Bjorn Engelman at Cutting Room

Cover art
Photography by Paul Bergen
Graphic design by Misha van Tol

Chart positions

References 
http://www.johnnorum.se/

John Norum albums
2010 albums
Mascot Records albums